The Lehigh Valley, known colloquially as The Valley, is a geographic and metropolitan region formed by the Lehigh River in Lehigh County and Northampton County in eastern Pennsylvania. It is a component valley of the Great Appalachian Valley bounded to its north by Blue Mountain, to its south by South Mountain, to its west by Lebanon Valley, and to its east by the Delaware River and Warren County, New Jersey. The Lehigh Valley's largest city is Allentown, the third largest city in Pennsylvania and the county seat of Lehigh County, with a population of 125,845 residents as of the 2020 census.

The Allentown–Bethlehem–Easton metropolitan area, which includes the Lehigh Valley, is currently Pennsylvania's third most populous metropolitan area after those of Philadelphia and Pittsburgh, and the nation's 68th largest metropolitan area with a population of 861,889 residents as of 2020. Lehigh County is among Pennsylvania's fastest-growing counties, and the Lehigh Valley leads Pennsylvania in terms of population growth in the 18- to 34-year old demographic, which constitutes a significant portion of the labor workforce. The region's core population centers are located in southern and central Lehigh and Northampton counties along Interstate 78, Interstate 476, Pennsylvania Route 309, and U.S. Route 22.

The Lehigh Valley has historically been a global leader in steel and other heavy manufacturing industries, which represented a considerable portion of its employment and economic production for most of the 20th century. Beginning in the early 1980s, however, the region's heavy manufacturing sector experienced a rapid downfall, highlighted by the downsizing and ultimate closure of Bethlehem Steel, once the world's second largest steel manufacturer, and other Valley-based manufacturing companies. The Valley's economy struggled considerably before ultimately rebounding and since emerging in the 21st century as one of Pennsylvania's largest and fastest-growing economies. As of 2020, the Lehigh Valley's total gross domestic product (GDP) is $42.9 billion, driven by diverse industry sector contributions from its finance, manufacturing, health care and education, and information sectors. Between 2016 and 2017 alone, the Lehigh Valley experienced 5% GDP growth. The Lehigh Valley has also emerged as an epicenter for the U.S. logistics industry, including warehousing and intermodal transport.

The region's primary commercial airport is Lehigh Valley International Airport in Hanover Township; the airport's air traffic has grown considerably in the 21st century, largely as a result of considerable growth in its commercial air cargo traffic, which exceeded 210 million pounds in 2016.

The region is located geographically within a one-day drive to over a third of the U.S. population and over half of Canada's population, which has been a factor in its 21st century emergence as a North American leader in light manufacturing and commercial distribution. Gains in these and other industries have helped offset the significant losses the region had experienced from its late 20th century decline in heavy manufacturing. 

Since its settlement in the 1700s, the Lehigh Valley has been the birthplace or home to several notable Americans who have proven influential across a broad range of fields, including academia, art and music, business, government and politics, the military, professional and Olympic-level athletics, and other fields.

History

The Lehigh Valley was settled in the first half of the 1700s by predominantly German immigrants fleeing war and religious persecution. Prior to their arrival, the region was inhabited by Lenape Indian tribes who hunted, fished, and quarried jasper in the region. Sons of provincial Pennsylvania founder William Penn acquired much of the Lehigh Valley in the Walking Purchase in 1737 during the colonial period. Lenape Indians subsequently retaliated with raids against European settlers throughout the 1750s and early 1760s but were moved out of the region by the mid-1760s. The region was initially established in 1682 as part of Bucks County. In 1752, the region became part of Northampton County, and Lehigh County was later separated from Northampton County and formally established in 1812. Shelter House in Emmaus, constructed in 1734 by Pennsylvania German settlers, is the oldest still-standing building structure in the Lehigh Valley and believed to be one of the oldest in the state.

American Revolutionary War

Allentown and its surrounding communities played an important and historic role in the emergence of the American Revolution. Some of the first resistance to British colonialism began in Allentown and surrounding Lehigh County communities in the Lehigh Valley. As early as June 21, 1774, patriot forces in Allentown began meeting to formulate resistance plans to British colonial governance. On December 21, 1774, a Committee of Observation was formally established by Allentown-area patriot militias.

Following the signing of the Declaration of Independence, the Colonial British government in Allentown began dissolving and these patriot militias seized control, pressuring Tories out of the region. Washington and his Continental Army staff passed through Allentown following their victory at the Battle of Trenton, traveling up Lehigh Street, which was then called Water Street. Washington and his staff stopped at the foot of Lehigh Street at a large spring on what today is the property occupied by Wire Mill. They rested there, watered their horses, and then proceeded to their post of duty. Allentown supported the Revolution, establishing the first hospitals for treatment of wounded Continental Army troops at various city locations, including at the current location of the Farr Building at 739 Hamilton Street.

Washington and his commanders also chose to establish two POW camps in Allentown, one at 8th and Hamilton Streets and another on Gordon Street, to house Hessian mercenaries captured at the Battle of Trenton. In addition to visiting Allentown after his victory at the Battle of Trenton, Washington returned to the city and region several additional times during and following the Revolution.

Allentown also played a historical role in protecting the Liberty Bell from British capture following the September 26, 1777 fall of Philadelphia to the British Army, concealing the Liberty Bell for nine months from September 1777 to June 1778 under floor boards in Allentown's Zion Reformed Church. After Washington and the Continental Army's defeat at the Battle of Brandywine on September 11, 1777, the revolutionary capital of Philadelphia was left defenseless and Pennsylvania's Supreme Executive Council, anticipating Philadelphia's fall, ordered that eleven Philadelphia bells, including the Liberty Bell (then known as the State House Bell), be taken down and moved to present day Allentown (then called Northampton Towne). Once arriving in Allentown, the Liberty Bell and other bells were hidden under floor boards at Zion Reformed Church on West Hamilton Street to protect them from being seized and melted down by the British Army for use as munitions.

In 1962, inside this still-standing church at 622 West Hamilton Street in Allentown, the Liberty Bell Museum was opened to commemorate this successful concealment of the Liberty Bell in Allentown during the American Revolution.

American Civil War

The region again proved influential in the American Civil War. Following the Union Army's defeat at the Battle of Fort Sumter and Lincoln's April 15, 1861 proclamation calling for state militia to provide 75,000 volunteers to defend the national capital in Washington, D.C., Allentown immediately deployed its Allen Infantry, which defended Washington, D.C. from Confederate attack following Fort Sumter's fall. Also known as the Allen Guards, the Allen Infantry mustered in for duty on April 18, 1861. During the late summer and early fall of 1861, members of this unit and other volunteers from within and beyond the Lehigh Valley came together to form the 47th Pennsylvania Infantry Regiment, which was established on August 5 and later proved influential in expanding the Union Army's reach into the Deep South, permitting it to launch successful attacks against Confederate positions in the Battle of St. Johns Bluff in 1862 and throughout the Red River campaign in the Trans-Mississippi theater and Sheridan's Shenadoah Valley campaign across Virginia in 1864. These victories helped to tip the Civil War in the Union's favor. On October 19, 1899, a monument in honor of the Lehigh Valley men killed in their volunteer service to the Union's preservation, the Soldiers and Sailors Monument, was erected at Seventh and Hamilton Streets in Center City Allentown, where it still stands.

Industrial Revolution

The opening of the Lehigh Canal in 1827 contributed significantly to transforming Allentown and the Lehigh Valley from a rural agricultural area dominated by German-speaking people into one of the nation's first urbanized industrialized areas. The Lehigh Valley underwent significant industrialization throughout the 19th and most of the 20th centuries and was a major manufacturing hub in the American Industrial Revolution.

The Lehigh Valley is named for the Lehigh River, which runs through the region. It owes much of its development and history to anthracite coal, timber, and ore that was only commercially possible with the development of the Lehigh Canal and the Lehigh Valley's extensive railway infrastructure that permitted these minerals and later the region's manufactured steel to be transported for sale in major national and overseas markets. The Lehigh Canal operated into the Great Depression, feeding ports up and down the Delaware River, the Pennsylvania Canal, and transoceanic demand, and was integral to the industrialization of the greater Delaware Valley region. The Morris Canal, the  anthracite coal feeder of the Delaware and Raritan Canal. and locks at New Hope on the Delaware Canal were built to fuel anthracite energy needs of Trenton, Newark, Jersey City, and New York City.

In 1899, Bethlehem Steel was formed in Bethlehem, Pennsylvania in the Lehigh Valley. The company developed into the nation's second largest manufacturer of steel, and its steel was used in developing many of the nation's earliest and largest infrastructure and building projects, including the Empire State Building, Madison Square Garden, and Rockefeller Center in New York City, Merchandise Mart in Chicago, the George Washington, Verrazzano, and Golden Gate Bridges, and warships and other military equipment that proved essential in American-led victories in both World Wars. The company's ascent during the 20th century was very prominently associated with the emergence of the U.S. as both a world leader in global manufacturing and as the world's largest economy, and its demise has sometimes been pointed to as one of the nation's most prominent first stumbling points in the face of foreign competition and other economic challenges that emerged in the late 20th century and contributed to the nation's emergence of its Rust Belt.

Following nearly a century of global leadership, growth, and profitability in steel manufacturing, Bethlehem Steel abruptly reported operating losses of $1.5 billion in 1982,  citing foreign competition from Asian economies and costly U.S. governmental regulations and labor costs for the losses. The company abruptly reduced operations, resulting in considerable Lehigh Valley layoffs and a dramatic related economic downturn in the region. The company continued functioning on a vastly reduced scale for a period, but ultimately ceased steel manufacturing entirely at its primary Bethlehem manufacturing plant in 1995. In 2001, the company filed for bankruptcy protection and, in 2003, the company was dissolved. In the late 20th and early 21st centuries, the downturn and ultimate demise of Bethlehem Steel, once one of the most iconic and prominent symbols of American global economic power and leadership, emerged as an example cited by those who believe American global economic leadership is now in either gradual or even rapid descent.

Geography

The Lehigh Valley is geologically and geographically part of the Great Appalachian Valley, a geographic region made up of limestone that stretches along the eastern edge of the Appalachian Mountains. The Lehigh Valley is so named because it is located geographically within an actual valley formed by the Lehigh River that lies between two mountain ridges, Blue Mountain in the Valley's north and South Mountain in the Valley's south. The Lehigh Valley is the lower part of the drainage basin of the Lehigh River.

Cities and location 

The Lehigh Valley has three principal cities: Allentown, Bethlehem, and Easton.
The region borders Carbon County and the Coal Region to its north, the Delaware River and Warren County, New Jersey to its east, Bucks and Montgomery Counties in suburban Philadelphia to its south, and Berks and Schuylkill Counties to its west.

Cities
 Allentown (125,845)
 Bethlehem (75,781)
 Easton (28,127)

Municipalities with more than 10,000 people 

 Bethlehem Township (23,730)
 Emmaus (11,652)
 Forks Township (14,721)
 Hanover Township (Northampton) (10,866)
 Lehigh Township (10,526)
 Lower Macungie Township (31,964)
 Lower Saucon Township (10,772)
 Northampton (10,395)
 North Whitehall Township (15,655)
 Palmer Township (20,691)
 Salisbury Township (13,505)
 South Whitehall Township (19,180)
 Upper Macungie Township (26,377)
 Upper Saucon Township (14,808)
 Whitehall Township (26,738)

Municipalities with fewer than 10,000 but more than 5,000 people 

 Ancient Oaks
 Bangor
 Breinigsville
 Bushkill Township
 Catasauqua
 Chestnut Hill
 Hellertown
 Lower Nazareth Township
 Moore Township
 Nazareth
 Plainfield Township
 Upper Milford Township
 Upper Mount Bethel
 Upper Nazareth Township
 Washington Township (Lehigh)
 Washington Township (Northampton)
 Williams Township
 Wilson

Municipalities with fewer than 5,000 people 

 Alburtis
 Allen Township
 Bath
 Chapman
 Coopersburg
 Coplay
 East Allen Township
 East Bangor
 Fountain Hill
 Freemansburg
 Glendon
 Hanover Township (Lehigh)
 Heidelberg Township
 Lower Milford Township
 Lower Mount Bethel Township
 Lowhill Township
 Lynn Township
 Macungie
 North Catasauqua
 Pen Argyl
 Portland
 Roseto
 Slatington
 Stockertown
 Tatamy
 Walnutport
 Weisenberg Township
 West Easton
 Wind Gap

Census-designated places and villages 

 Ackermanville
 Balliettsville
 Beersville
 Belfast
 Berlinsville
 Best Station
 Butztown
 Cementon
 Center Valley
 Cetronia
 Cherryville
 Chickentown
 Christian Springs
 Colesville
 Danielsville
 DeSales University
 Dorneyville
 Eagle Point
 Eastlawn Gardens
 East Texas
 Egypt
 Emanuelsville
 Emerald
 Flicksville
 Fogelsville
 Franks Corner
 Friedensville
 Fullerton
 Gauff Hill
 Germansville
 Hanoverville
 Hensingersville
 Hokendauqua
 Hollo
 Hosensack
 Ironton
 Jacksonville
 Katellen
 Klecknersville
 Kuhnsville
 Lanark
 Laurys Station
 Limeport
 Locust Valley
 Lynnport
 Martin's Creek
 Mickleys
 Middletown
 Moorestown
 Morgan Hill
 Mount Bethel
 Neffs
 Newburg
 New Smithville
 New Tripoli
 Old Orchard
 Old Zionsville
 Orefield
 Palmer Heights
 Pleasant Corners
 Powder Valley
 Raubsville
 Scherersville
 Schnecksville
 Schoenersville
 Seidersville
 Shimerville
 Sigmund
 Slatedale
 Slateford
 Stiles
 Summit Lawn
 Trexlertown
 Treichlers
 Vera Cruz
 Walbert
 Wanamakers
 Wassergass
 Werleys Corner
 Wescosville
 West Catasauqua
 Zionsville
 Zucksville

Metropolitan and Combined Statistical Areas 

The Allentown-Bethlehem-Easton, PA-NJ Metropolitan Statistical Area is a Metropolitan Statistical Area that includes Carbon County in the Coal Region, Lehigh and Northampton counties in eastern Pennsylvania, and Warren County in the Skylands region of northwest New Jersey. As of the 2020 census, it is the 68th largest metropolitan area in the nation with a population of 861,889.

Climate 

The Lehigh Valley has four distinct seasons, which typically include hot and humid summers, cold winters, and short and mild springs and falls. It has a humid continental climate (Dfa/Dfb) and the hardiness zone ranges from 5b in higher elevation locations in northern Carbon County to 6b (the principal zone in Lehigh, Northampton, and southern Warren Counties). The 1991-2020 hardiness zone for the airport and lower elevations is 7a.

Demographics

The Lehigh Valley has a total population of 861,889 residents as of the 2020 U.S. census, making it the third largest metropolitan area in Pennsylvania and 68th largest metropolitan area in the nation.

A 2018 American Community Survey conducted by the U.S. Census Bureau found that 87.1% of the Lehigh Valley's population was White American, 4.6% was Black or African American, 0.1% was American Indian, 2.3% was Asian American, 0.1% was Native Hawaiian, 0.1% were Pacific Islander Americans, 4.3% were of some other race, and 1.5% belonged to two or more races. Hispanics and Latinos of any race made up 11.3% of the population and represent the Lehigh Valley's fastest-growing demographic. Lehigh County is in the top 1% of all U.S. counties for inward migration from international locations, according to Select USA, a U.S. Department of Commerce program. The Lehigh Valley as a whole leads Pennsylvania in terms of population growth in the 18-to-34 year old demographic, according to 2020 census data.

The Lehigh Valley's population growth is partly a result of a growing influx of residents from New Jersey and New York drawn to the Lehigh Valley's lower cost of living, its employment opportunities, and its close proximity to Philadelphia and New York City, the nation's sixth and largest cities, respectively. The Valley's population is expected to increase by 227,000 people by 2040, making it one of the fastest-growing areas in the state and nation.

Median household income for the region increased from $57,288 to $62,507 between 2015 and 2019.

Economy 

 

The Lehigh Valley's economy has been known historically and globally for its leadership throughout the 19th and 20th centuries in heavy manufacturing. Beginning in the 1980s, however, the region's manufacturing sector declined rapidly as a result of foreign competition, trade practices, operational costs, regulations, and other factors. The most prominent example was the plight of Bethlehem Steel, once the nation's second largest manufacturer of steel. Headquartered in Bethlehem, Pennsylvania, Bethlehem Steel suspended most of its operations in the early 1980s and ultimately declared bankruptcy in 2001 and was dissolved in 2003.

Since the late 20th century, the Lehigh Valley has begun to recover from the loss of its once powerful manufacturing base and other industry sectors have emerged in the region, providing a more diversified regional economy. As of 2020, the Valley's top five industries were: 1.) finance, 2.) manufacturing, 3.) health care and education, 4.) professional and business services, and 5.) information. Other major industry sectors in the area include transportation, retail trade, and restaurants and hospitality. As of 2020, the Lehigh Valley's total gross domestic product was $42.9 billion.

Bethlehem Steel

The Lehigh Valley is known historically for its production of steel, Portland cement, silk, and apparel. Bethlehem Steel, founded in 1899 and based in Bethlehem, Pennsylvania, was a foundation of the Lehigh Valley's economy for nearly a century from 1899 through the early 1980s. At the pinnacle of its success, Bethlehem Steel was the nation's second largest and one of the world's largest steel manufacturers. Bethlehem Steel was instrumental in the development of many of the nation's most prominent 20th century infrastructure projects. Its steel was used to build 28 Liberty Street, Chrysler Building, the Empire State Building, Madison Square Garden, Rockefeller Center, and the Waldorf Astoria hotel in New York City and Merchandise Mart in Chicago. Among major bridges, the company's steel was used to construct the George Washington Bridge and Verrazzano-Narrows Bridge in New York City, the Golden Gate Bridge in San Francisco, and the Peace Bridge between Buffalo and Fort Erie, Ontario. The Roosevelt administration relied heavily on Bethlehem Steel during World War II, utilizing the company to produce the steel necessary for shipbuilding, ammunition, and other military equipment that proved essential to the Allies' ability to prevail in these conflicts.

In the late 20th century, however, a variety of factors, including the practices of foreign competitors, began eroding Bethlehem Steel's once historical global leadership in steelmaking. In 1982, the company announced it was discontinuing most of its operations. In 2001, the company declared bankruptcy. In 2003, it was dissolved. Throughout the late 20th century, other heavy manufacturing companies in the Lehigh Valley that once served as backbones for the region's economy suffered similarly, either downsizing significantly or dissolving, which destabilized the region considerably.

In the early 2000s, seeking to replace the heavy manufacturing companies that had been the region's foundation for decades, the Lehigh Valley began developing other economic sectors, including financial services, health care, life sciences, and technology. The Lehigh Valley also began emerging as a national warehouse and distribution hub, largely due to its proximity to many of the largest U.S. markets and relatively lower operating costs compared to other Northeast U.S. regions. More recently, a movement to reestablish manufacturing activities in the U.S., driven by customer demand for American-made products, faster product delivery, increased overseas wages, and inflated costs and extended timeframes for shipping has led to some renewed growth in the Valley's manufacturing sector. Several large companies from China and Germany have invested tens of millions of dollars into developing significant operations in the Lehigh Valley, which has generated thousands of new jobs in the region.

Largest employers 
As of 2019, the Lehigh Valley's top five employers are: 1.) Lehigh Valley Health Network, 2.) St. Luke's Hospital and Health Network, 3.) Amazon, 4.) Lehigh Valley Physician Group, and 5.) Mack Trucks.

Business and economic environment 
The Lehigh Valley is one of the fastest-growing and largest economies in Pennsylvania with a total GDP of $43.8 billion that saw a five percent increase between 2016 and 2017 alone driven by strong manufacturing, financial, health care, and professional services industry segments. It is centrally located in the Northeast megalopolis with ease of access and close proximity to several of the largest U.S. markets, population centers, airports, terminals, railways, and seaports, including the New York City and Philadelphia metropolitan areas. The Lehigh Valley is within a one-day drive to over a third of the U.S. population and to over half the population of Canada. The Valley has a lower cost of living, more affordable real estate, lower taxes, and a larger and more affordable labor pool than many other Northeastern U.S. metropolitan regions. These attributes and others, including sizable investments in business development incentive programs and a friendlier regulatory environment, provide the area with a comparatively favorable business climate compared to surrounding metropolitan areas.

Due in large part to this comparably favorable business climate and mature business support programs, the Lehigh Valley has been very successful in luring established businesses as well as new startup companies from higher cost areas such as New York and New Jersey, generating thousands of new jobs and significant new investments in the region. Large companies such as Amazon.com have praised the Lehigh Valley for its commitment to business support, infrastructure investment, and incentive programs, citing these as major reasons for their continuing expansions and increased hiring in the region and Allegiant Air, a low-cost budget airline, opened a new flight base at the Lehigh Valley International Airport in February 2020, noting the area's rapid growth, lower operational business costs, and its proximity to popular destinations as significant reasons for expanding their Lehigh Valley International Airport flights.

Other large national and international companies either based in the Lehigh Valley or with significant operations there include Broadcom Corporation (in Allentown), Avantor Performance Materials (in Allentown), Air Products (in Trexlertown), Crayola (in Easton), Buckeye Partners (in Emmaus), HeidelbergCement (in Fogelsville), Just Born (in Bethlehem, maker of Peeps candies), Mack Trucks (in Allentown), Martin Guitar (in Nazareth), Olympus Corporation (in Center Valley), OraSure Technologies (in Bethlehem), PPL Corporation (in Allentown), Wind Creek Bethlehem (in Bethlehem), Dun & Bradstreet (in Center Valley), Victaulic (in Easton), and others.

The Lehigh Valley was recognized by business publication Site Selection Magazine in 2014, 2017, 2018, and again in 2019 as being the second-best performing region of its size for economic development in the nation and the best performing region in the entire Northeast U.S.. It was ranked by Fortune in 2015 as one of the top 10 best places in the U.S. to locate corporate finance and information technology operations, including call and IT support centers. Allentown, the Lehigh Valley's largest city, was cited as a "national success story" in April 2016 by the Urban Land Institute for its downtown redevelopment and transformation that has led to $1 billion worth of new development projects there between 2015 and 2019, one of only six communities nationally to achieve this distinction.

The Lehigh Valley is one of the leading areas on the East Coast for warehouses and distribution centers. Because of this, it is sometimes referred to as the nation's "second Inland Empire" for freight. Large national companies that own and operate warehouses and distribution centers in the Lehigh Valley include Amazon.com, B. Braun, Boston Beer Company (brewer of Samuel Adams brand beer), BMW, Bridgestone, FedEx SmartPost, FedEx Ground, Home Depot, J. C. Penney, Nestlé Purina, ShopRite, Stitch Fix, The Coca-Cola Company, Ocean Spray, Phillips Pet Food and Supplies, True Value, Uline, Zulily, and others. Most of these warehouses and distribution centers are located along the Valley's southern U.S. Route 22, Interstate 78, and Interstate 476 corridors, which provide direct access to numerous major markets throughout the Northeast U.S. and beyond.

In 2018, due to this direct access and proximity to major markets, FedEx Ground constructed their largest distribution hub in the country in the Lehigh Valley near Lehigh Valley International Airport. This new hub can process up to 45,000 packages per hour and currently employs over 2,000 people. By 2030, it is expected to have a total size of  square feet and employ over 3,000 people. It opened in September 2018 at a cost of $335 million to build.

The Boston Beer Company operates its largest U.S. production brewery facility in Breinigsville in the Lehigh Valley, which produces over 2/3rds of all Samuel Adams beer globally. The company continues to upgrade and expand operations at this facility and has cited the location as central to its overall corporate success. Additionally, Ocean Spray, a popular maker of juice drinks and other fruit products, produces 40 percent of its total national beverage volume at its Lehigh Valley plant in Breinigsville. Due to Pennsylvania's lack of an excise tax on cigars and the Lehigh Valley's close proximity to major markets, the region is home to some of the nation's largest cigar distributors and retailers.

Retail shopping 
The largest retail shopping area in the Lehigh Valley is the PA Route 145/MacArthur Road corridor, just north of Allentown in Whitehall Township, which is anchored by Lehigh Valley Mall and Whitehall Mall.

Other Lehigh Valley malls include Palmer Park Mall in Easton, Pennsylvania, South Mall in Salisbury Township, and Westgate Mall in Bethlehem, Pennsylvania. In October 2006, The Promenade Shops at Saucon Valley, located off Route 309 in Upper Saucon Township in the Lehigh Valley, opened. The Promenade is roughly half the size of the Lehigh Valley Mall but features higher end stores not available in Lehigh Valley Mall. In 2011, The Outlets at Wind Creek Bethlehem opened at Wind Creek Bethlehem in Bethlehem, becoming the Lehigh Valley's first outlet mall.

Yocco's Hot Dogs, the regionally famous fast food establishment founded in 1922 and known for their hot dogs and cheesesteaks, maintains four Lehigh Valley locations, including two in Allentown, one in Fogelsville, and one in Trexlertown.

Media

Television
The Lehigh Valley is part of the Philadelphia television market, the nation's fourth largest television market, and also receives television stations from the New York City and Scranton/Wilkes-Barre television markets. Lehigh Valley-based stations  include WBPH-TV (a Christian television licensed to Bethlehem, Pennsylvania with studios in Allentown), WFMZ-TV (an independent commercial television station on South Mountain in Allentown), and WLVT-TV (the PBS station licensed to Allentown with studios in Bethlehem).

Radio
The Lehigh Valley is home to over 35 radio stations, including both English and Spanish-language stations and a range of formats, including all-news, sports radio, talk radio, and NPR. Lehigh Valley station music formats include Top 40, hip hop, rhythmic, country, oldies, polka, soft rock, classic rock, hard rock, and several campus radio stations.

Newspapers
Lehigh Valley-based daily newspapers include The Morning Call and The Express-Times, both of which have been media sources in the Lehigh Valley dating back to the mid-1800s. Two magazines cover the region: Lehigh Valley Style is a regional lifestyle publication based in Easton. Lehigh Valley Magazine, based in Harrisburg, is the region's oldest lifestyle publication.

Film

Multiple movies have been fully or partially filmed in the Lehigh Valley, including M. Night Shyamalan's Glass in 2019, indie dark-comedy Getting Grace starring Daniel Roebuck, Taylor A. Purdee's folk rock musical Killian & the Comeback Kids, and others.

Education

Colleges and universities
Seven colleges and universities are based in the Lehigh Valley:
 Cedar Crest College (in Allentown)
 DeSales University (in Center Valley)
 Lafayette College (in Easton)
 Lehigh University (in Bethlehem)
 Moravian University (in Bethlehem)
 Muhlenberg College (in Allentown)
 Penn State Lehigh Valley (in Center Valley)

The Lehigh Valley has two two-year colleges:
 Lehigh Carbon Community College (with campuses in Allentown, Carbon County and Schnecksville)
 Northampton Community College (with campuses in Bethlehem, Bethlehem Township and Monroe County)

High school education

The Lehigh Valley is the third most populous metropolitan region in Pennsylvania and served by multiple large school districts, public and private high schools, middle schools, and elementary schools, including:

The largest high schools in the Lehigh Valley and The Poconos (18 in all) compete athletically in the Eastern Pennsylvania Conference. Smaller Lehigh Valley high schools compete in the Colonial League.

Sports

Football

College football

The Lehigh Valley is home to the nation's longest-standing college football rivalry in the nation. Known simply as "The Rivalry," Lafayette College in Easton, Pennsylvania and Lehigh University in Bethlehem, Pennsylvania have played each other 157 times since 1884, making it the most-played rivalry in college football history. Two other Lehigh Valley colleges, Moravian University in Bethlehem and Muhlenberg College in Allentown, have competitive collegiate football programs; Muhlenberg plays their home football games at Scotty Wood Stadium on the Muhlenberg campus in Allentown.

National Football League
From 1996 until 2012, the Lehigh Valley hosted the pre-season training camp for the NFL's Philadelphia Eagles, which was held each summer on Goodman Stadium and other the football fields at Lehigh University in Bethlehem. On August 5, 2012, Garrett Reid, the 29-year-old son of then Eagles head coach Andy Reid, was found dead in his Lehigh University dorm room during training camp from a heroin overdose. The following year, in 2013, following the Garrett Reid overdose and the hiring of new head coach Chip Kelly, the Eagles chose to move their training camp to the NovaCare Complex in South Philadelphia.

Gymnastics 

Parkettes National Gymnastics Training Center in Allentown has been the training ground for numerous Olympic and U.S. national gymnastics champions. In 2003, CNN aired a highly critical documentary on the center, Achieving the Perfect 10, which depicted its as a hugely demanding and excessively competitive training program.

High school athletics 

The 18 largest high schools in the Lehigh Valley and Pocono Mountain regions compete athletically in the Eastern Pennsylvania Conference (EPC), one of the nation's premier athletic divisions. An additional 14 Lehigh Valley high schools too small to compete in the EPC belong to the Colonial League.

The EPC has produced numerous professional and Olympic athletes, including MLB, the NBA, and the NFL professional athletes. The EPC's football, basketball, field hockey, and wrestling teams are often ranked among the nation's best. In high school field hockey, Emmaus High School in Emmaus has won 33 consecutive EPC championships as of 2021.

The Lehigh Valley's high school wrestling programs have been described as "among the nation’s best in the sport for nearly three decades" and WIN magazine has ranked the region's wrestling programs best in the nation.

Professional baseball 

In 2008, Coca-Cola Park, an 8,278-seat Minor League baseball stadium, opened in east-side Allentown. The stadium is the home field for the Lehigh Valley IronPigs, the Triple-A affiliate of the Philadelphia Phillies of Major League Baseball. The team previously played as the Ottawa Lynx from 1993 until moving to Allentown in 2008. The club's move to the Lehigh Valley brought the franchise closer to Philadelphia and the Phillies' large Lehigh Valley fan base. The team's name is a reference to pig iron, which is used in steelmaking for which the Lehigh Valley area is known worldwide. Groundbreaking ceremonies for Coca-Cola Park were held September 6, 2006, and construction was completed in December 2007. The stadium's first game was March 30, 2008, featuring the Phillies major league team playing the Lehigh Valley IronPigs.

Professional ice hockey 

On September 10, 2014, the PPL Center, an 8,500-seat arena in Center City Allentown, was opened as the new home arena for the Lehigh Valley Phantoms, the American Hockey League affiliate of the Philadelphia Flyers, and for other sporting and entertainment events. The Phantoms began play at PPL Center with their 2014–15 season. The arena takes up the entire block between Seventh and Eighth Streets and Hamilton Boulevard and Linden Street.

Roller derby

Lehigh Valley Roller Derby (LVRG) is a Women's Flat Track Derby Association league based at Bethlehem Municipal Ice Rink in Bethlehem in the Lehigh Valley. The league's teams compete nationally and internationally.

Running events 
The Lehigh Valley Health Network Via Marathon, sponsored by Lehigh Valley Health Network, features a certified marathon, five-person team relay, a  training run, and 5K walk annually in September. The  course follows the Lehigh River Canal Towpath from Allentown to Easton. The marathon came under scrutiny in 2015 when Mike Rossi achieved viral fame after allegedly cheating in the marathon to qualify for the Boston Marathon. In response, Via Marathon organizers added timing mats and video surveillance on the course. Lehigh University's Paul Short Run is held annually at the Goodman Cross Country Course; participation has climbed to over 5,000 runners spread throughout 14 college and high school races. The Emmaus 5K race is held annually in mid-October, coinciding with Emmaus' annual Halloween parade.

Track cycling

The Lehigh Valley is home to the Valley Preferred Cycling Center, a cycling velodrome in Breinigsville that hosts professional and amateur cycling competitions, including Union Cycliste Internationale-sponsored competitions. Valley Preferred Cycling Center has given rise to several Olympian cycling medal winners.

Culture

The Allentown Art Museum, located in Center City Allentown, is the Lehigh Valley's largest museum with over 11,000 works of art. Lehigh University's Zoellner Arts Center and Lafayette College's smaller Williams Center for the Arts host a variety of plays, concerts, and performances throughout the year. The Allentown Symphony Orchestra, conducted by Diane Wittry since 1995, performs at Allentown's historic Miller Symphony Hall. The Banana Factory, located in South Bethlehem, has several art studios and galleries open to the public.

Recreation

Amusement park

The Lehigh Valley is home to Dorney Park & Wildwater Kingdom, a popular amusement and water park, located in South Whitehall Township. Dorney Park is known nationally for its elaborate roller coasters and water rides.

Casino

In 2009, Sands Casino Resort, an $879 million casino, hotel and apartment complex then owned by the Las Vegas Sands opened in Bethlehem, Pennsylvania, bringing legalized table and sports gambling to the Lehigh Valley for the first time. In 2018, the casino was renamed Wind Creek Bethlehem following its $1.3 billion sale to Wind Creek Hospitality. Wind Creek Bethlehem is one of only 13 authorized gaming sites in Pennsylvania.

Festivals

Several large festivals are held annually in the Lehigh Valley. The Great Allentown Fair, first held in 1852, is held annually in late August through early September at the Allentown Fairgrounds in Allentown. Musikfest, a large, 10-day music festival, is held annually in Bethlehem, Pennsylvania each August. Das Awkscht Fescht, an antique car festival, is held annually the beginning of August in Macungie's Memorial Park. Blues, Brews, and Barbeque, launched in 2014, is held annually in May in Center City Allentown. Mayfair, a three-day arts festival, is held annually the end of May on the campus of Cedar Crest College in Allentown.

Golf and skiing

The Valley's multiple golf courses include Saucon Valley Country Club in Upper Saucon Township, which hosted the 2009 U.S. Women's Open. Others include Allentown Municipal Golf Course, Brookside Country Club in Macungie, Green Pond Country Club in Bethlehem, Lehigh Country Club on Cedar Crest Boulevard in Allentown, Olde Homestead Golf Club in New Tripoli, Riverview Country Club in Easton, Shepherd Hills Golf Club in Wescosville, Steel Club in Hellertown, Southmoore Golf Course in Bath, Wedgewood Golf Course in Coopersburg, Willow Brook Golf Course in Northampton, and others.

Ice sports and skiing

The region's primary ski resort is Bear Creek Mountain Resort, a 23 slope resort in Macungie. Three Lehigh Valley locations exist for ice skating, ice hockey, figure skating, and speed skating. Steel Ice Center is on East 1st Street in Bethlehem, The Rink Ice Arena is in Lehigh County, and the City of Bethlehem maintains a covered 23,000-square-foot outdoor ice rink from November through March. Bethlehem Skateplaza on Steel Avenue in Bethlehem is a city park for skateboarding and freestyle BMX.

Parks and zoo

The Lehigh Valley Zoo in Schnecksville is a  zoo open year-round. The Lehigh Valley has a number of public parks, including the  Lehigh Parkway along the Lehigh River in Allentown and the  Trexler Nature Preserve in Schnecksville.

Transportation

Air transportation 

The airport was utilized by 851,000 passengers in 2020. Allegiant Air recently completed a significant expansion at the airport.

The Valley is also served by Allentown Queen City Municipal Airport, a two-runway general aviation facility located off Allentown's Lehigh Street, used predominantly by  private aviation. Other general-aviation airports include Braden Airpark (also owned by the Lehigh-Northampton Airport Authority) in Easton, Pennsylvania, Hackettstown Airport in eastern Warren County, New Jersey, and Jake Arner Memorial Airport in Lehighton.

Bus transportation 

Public bus service in Lehigh Valley is available through the Lehigh and Northampton Transportation Authority, known as LANta. In New Jersey, bus service is provided by NJ Transit, including to Centre Square in Easton, Pennsylvania.

The Lehigh Valley has several commercial bus services, including Greyhound Lines, Klein Transportation, and Trailways, and others, that provide transportation to and from New York City, Philadelphia, Reading, Harrisburg and other regional destinations throughout the day. Additionally, OurBus provides service to and from Philadelphia, Martz Trailways provides transport from the region to Scranton via Wilkes-Barre. It also provides service to Philadelphia as an Amtrak Thruway Motorcoach route that connects to Amtrak at 30th Street Station in Philadelphia. Chinatown bus lines operates multiple roundtrip bus lines daily between Manhattan and Wind Creek Bethlehem in Bethlehem; as of 2014, more than 3,000 passengers daily utilized Chinatown bus lines' service from Manhattan to Wind Creek Bethlehem.

Commercial rail

The Lehigh Valley is a major national thruway for commercial rail transport with roughly 65 commercial trains passing through the Valley daily. The region's largest freight rail operator is Norfolk Southern Railway, which uses two former rail lines, Lehigh Valley Railroad's Lehigh Line and Reading Railroad's Reading Line. Norfolk Southern Railway has major classification rail yards in both Allentown and Bethlehem.

Passenger rail
The Valley's closest Amtrak station is Bryn Mawr SEPTA,  miles south of the Valley.

Roads 

The Lehigh Valley is accessible from four major highways:

Interstate 476, the Northeast Extension of the Pennsylvania Turnpike, is a toll highway that runs  from Chester in the south to Scranton and Wilkes-Barre region in the north.
Interstate 78 is a major east–west highway that runs through the southern part of the Valley and is duplexed with Pennsylvania Route 309. I-78 runs from Lebanon County in the west to the Holland Tunnel and Lower Manhattan in the east.
Pennsylvania Route 33 runs north–south through the Lehigh Valley from the Poconos in the north to Northampton County in the south. 
U.S. Route 22 is a major freeway that runs through the Valley from Kuhnsville in the western part of the Valley to Easton in the Valley's east. The highway extends from Cincinnati, Ohio in the west through the Valley to Newark, New Jersey at its eastern terminus.

Other major Lehigh Valley roads include:
Cedar Crest Boulevard is a north–south highway that runs from North Whitehall Township in the north through West Allentown to Emmaus in the south. 
Lehigh Street runs northeast to southwest, originating in Center City Allentown and terminating in Emmaus. 
Pennsylvania Route 145 is a divided local road that leads to the Lehigh Valley Mall and its surrounding commercial district. 
Tilghman Street runs from Fogelsville in the west, continuing as Union Boulevard to Bethlehem in the east. Tilghman Street runs through most of Allentown, intersecting with Cedar Crest Boulevard, Pennsylvania Route 100, Pennsylvania Route 309, and several other major Lehigh Valley highways.

Telecommunications 

The Lehigh Valley area initially was served only by the 215 area code from 1947 (when the North American Numbering Plan of the Bell System went into effect) until 1994. With the region's growing population, the Lehigh Valley was granted area code 610 in 1994. Today, the Lehigh Valley is mainly covered by 610. An overlay area code, 484, was added to the 610 service area in 1999. Area code 835 is expected to become available in the Lehigh Valley in 2022.

Wine 
The Lehigh Valley AVA, which was designated an official American Viticultural Area in March 2008, includes  of vineyards planted to several Vitis vinifera and French-American hybrid grape varieties. Fifteen to twenty percent of all wine produced commercially in Pennsylvania comes from grapes grown in the Lehigh Valley AVA.

Notable people from the Lehigh Valley 

Since its settlement in the 18th century, the Lehigh Valley has been the birthplace or home to several famous Americans, including:
 Mario Andretti, former professional race car driver
 Michael Andretti, professional racing team owner and race car driver
 Saquon Barkley, professional football player, New York Giants
 Chuck Bednarik, former professional football player, Philadelphia Eagles, 1967 Pro Football Hall of Fame inductee
 Stephen Vincent Benét, former novelist and Pulitzer Prize-winning poet
 Leon Carr, former Broadway songwriter and composer
 Jack Coleman, television actor, Dynasty, Heroes, The Office, and Castle
 Michaela Conlin, television actress, Bones
 H.D., former poet and novelist
 Jimmy DeGrasso, heavy metal drummer, Ozzy Osbourne, Alice Cooper Band, Megadeth, Dokken, and Ratt
 Dane DeHaan, television and film actor, In Treatment, Chronicle, A Cure for Wellness, and Valerian and the City of a Thousand Planets
 Devon, adult film actress
 Keith Dorney, former professional football player, Detroit Lions
 Jonathan Frakes, actor, Star Trek: The Next Generation
 Mike Hartenstine, former professional football player, Chicago Bears and Minnesota Vikings
 Bob Heffner, former professional baseball player, Boston Red Sox, California Angels, and Cleveland Indians
 Tim Heidecker, actor, comedian, musician, Tim and Eric Awesome Show, Great Job! and Decker
 Larry Holmes, former boxing heavyweight champion
 Todd Howard, video game designer, Fallout and The Elder Scrolls
 Lee Iacocca, former president and chief executive officer, Chrysler 
 Keith Jarrett, jazz musician
 Michael Johns, healthcare executive and former White House presidential speechwriter
 Dwayne Johnson ("The Rock"), actor and former professional wrestler
 Billy Kidman, former professional wrestler and WWE producer
 Daniel Dae Kim, film and television actor, Lost
 Steve Kimock, rock musician
 Brian Knobbs, former professional wrestler
 Dan Koppen, former professional football player, Denver Broncos and New England Patriots
 Carson Kressley, fashion consultant, Bravo's Queer Eye
 Lisa Ann, adult film actress
 Varvara Lepchenko, professional tennis player
 Jonathan Linton, former professional football player, Buffalo Bills
 William Marchant, former playwright and screenwriter
 Kristen Maloney, 2000 Summer Olympics gymnast
 Ed McCaffrey, former professional football player, Denver Broncos, New York Giants, and San Francisco 49ers
 Kate Micucci, actress, comedian, singer, and songwriter
 Matt Millen, former professional football player, Oakland Raiders, San Francisco 49ers, and Washington Redskins and former president and general manager, Detroit Lions
 Lara Jill Miller, actress and voice actress, Gimme a Break! and The Amanda Show
 Marty Nothstein, former Olympic gold medal winner, track cycling
 Andre Reed, former professional football player, Buffalo Bills and Washington Redskins, 2014 Pro Football Hall of Fame inductee
 Ian Riccaboni, author and Ring of Honor professional wrestling sports broadcaster
 Daniel Roebuck, actor, Matlock, Lost, Glee, and Grimm
 Jimmie Schaffer, former professional baseball player, Chicago Cubs, Chicago White Sox, Cincinnati Reds, New York Mets, Philadelphia Phillies and St. Louis Cardinals
 Brian Schneider, former professional baseball player, Miami Marlins, New York Mets, Philadelphia Phillies, and Washington Nationals
 Amanda Seyfried, actress, Veronica Mars, Big Love, Mamma Mia!, and Les Misérables
 Curt Simmons, former professional baseball player, California Angels, Chicago Cubs, Philadelphia Phillies, and St. Louis Cardinals
 Dana Snyder, voice actor, Adult Swim's Aqua Teen Hunger Force
 Christine Taylor, actress and wife of actor Ben Stiller
 Jonathan Taylor Thomas, actor, Home Improvement
 Bobby Weaver, 1984 Summer Olympics gold medal winner, wrestling
 Lauren Weisberger, author, The Devil Wears Prada
 Cindy Werley, 1996 Summer Olympics field hockey player
 Jordan White, rock musician
 David Zinczenko, founder and chief executive officer, Galvanized, and author, Eat This, Not That
 David Zippel, Tony-award-winning lyricist, City of Angels

County statistics

Notes

References

External links 

Official website at Discover Lehigh Valley 
Lehigh Valley news at The Morning Call 
Lehigh Valley news at WFMZ-TV
"Famous People from the Lehigh Valley," The Morning Call, August 18, 2006
"Lehigh Valley Pop Culture Connections" at Discover Lehigh Valley, January 2, 2023 

 
Metropolitan areas of Pennsylvania
Regions of Pennsylvania
Valleys of Pennsylvania